Hatsingimari Junior College was established in 1993 and it is managed by the Pvt. Aided. It is located in a rural area. It is located in Hatsingimari Headquarters of South Salmara district of Assam. The college consists of Grades from 11 to 12. The College is co-educational and it doesn't have an attached pre-primary section. Assamese and English is the medium of instructions in this college. This college is approachable by all weather road. In this college academic session starts in April. This College is affiliated with Gauhati University

References

Universities and colleges in Assam
Colleges affiliated to Gauhati University
Educational institutions established in 1993
1993 establishments in Assam